The High School of World Cultures is one of the five schools housed in the James Monroe High School in the Bronx and offers instruction for "new arrival" students. The school caters to approximately 400 students from over 32 nations. The faculty of 20 is diverse and represents eleven different countries.

HSWC has been officially designated a "B" school by the NYC Department for Education in 2009 although the results were 0.6% away from an "A".

Public high schools in the Bronx
Soundview, Bronx